The East Columbia Historic District is a national historic district located at Farmington, St. Francois County, Missouri.  The district encompasses 11 contributing buildings in the central business district of Farmington. It developed between about 1879 and 1954, and includes representative examples of Late Victorian, Beaux Arts, and Bungalow / American Craftsman style architecture.  Notable buildings include the Tetley Jewelry Store (c. 1879), Andy Hahn Building (c. 1919), Lang and Holler Building (c. 1904), U.S. Post Office (c. 1932), and Henry C. Meyer Building (c. 1899), and T.F. Lockridge Harness Co. Building / Wichman Nash Service.

It was listed on the National Register of Historic Places in 2004 with a boundary increase in 2007.

References

Historic districts on the National Register of Historic Places in Missouri
Victorian architecture in Missouri
Beaux-Arts architecture in Missouri
Bungalow architecture in Missouri
Buildings and structures in St. Francois County, Missouri
National Register of Historic Places in St. Francois County, Missouri